Monte San Parteo (Corsican:  San Parteu) is a mountain peak located in Monticello, Haute-Corse, Corsica.
It is part of the Monte Cinto massif.

San Parteo straddles the communes of Pioggiola and Feliceto. It is part of a mountain range that marks both the entire northwestern part of the Regional Natural Park of Corsica and the western part of Giunssani. This chain includes some remarkable peaks, mainly Capu Ladroncellu (2145 m), Monte Corona (2144 meters), the Capu a u Dente (2025 meters), Punta Radich (2012 m), Monte Grosso (1937 meters) and San Parteo, and form a large part of the casket of Giunssani.

Until 1935, an Easter Monday procession took place in a chapel, now in ruins, situated at 1600 meters altitude in the San Parteo. The chapel was dedicated to Saint Parthée (San Parteu), a fifth-century saint who was very popular in the Giunssani.

Although not the highest, the San Parteo is not easily accessible. Some take a path from Feliceto, but this route has become notorious because of large landslides. An unmarked mountain path is said to "scale the east flank of the cirque and follows the ridge to the summit, from where you follow the spine of another ridge west to rejoin the waymarked trail to Mausoleo."

References

Mountains of Haute-Corse
Two-thousanders of France